David Ramadingaye (born 14 September 1989) is a Finnish footballer of Chadian descent currently playing for Finnish Veikkausliiga club KTP.

Career

Club career
On 19 December 2019 KTP confirmed, that they had signed Ramadingaye from AC Oulu.

References

External links

1989 births
Living people
Finnish footballers
Helsingin Jalkapalloklubi players
Myllykosken Pallo −47 players
IFK Mariehamn players
Klubi 04 players
FC Honka players
Rovaniemen Palloseura players
AC Oulu players
Kotkan Työväen Palloilijat players
Veikkausliiga players
Kakkonen players
Ykkönen players
Finnish people of Chadian descent
Association football midfielders
Sportspeople from Oulu